The men's doubles tournament at the 1983 US Open was held from August 30 to September 11, 1983, on the outdoor hard courts at the USTA National Tennis Center in New York City, United States. Peter Fleming and John McEnroe won the title, defeating Fritz Buehning and Van Winitsky in the final.

Seeds

Draw

Finals

Top half

Section 1

Section 2

Bottom half

Section 3

Section 4

External links
 Main draw
1983 US Open – Men's draws and results at the International Tennis Federation

Men's Doubles
US Open (tennis) by year – Men's doubles